Uru Eke  (born October 11, 1979) is a Nigerian actress and film producer. She is known for her producing debut "Remember Me", her role as Obi in Ndani TV's popular web series Rumour Has It. Last Flight to Abuja,  Africa Magic's Drama series BABY Drama and her second film as a producer called For Old Times' Sake. The actress, who was an IT professional before joining Nollywood, still shares her time between the Entertainment industry and the Tech world.

Early life and education
Eke is a descendant of the Mbaise region of Imo State, South-Eastern Nigeria, but she was born in Newham, East London in the United Kingdom. She had her basic education at Galleywall Infants School, London, before she moved to Nigeria where she attended Gideon Comprehensive High School for her secondary school education. In furtherance of her education, she returned to London and attended Lewisham College before proceeding to the University of Greenwich where she studied Business Information Technology.

Career
She started her career as an I.T consultant at Zurich Insurance Group and proceeded to work in a number of financial organizations across the UK. Uru switched careers in 2011 and has gone on to star in several movies.

Films
Forgive Me Father (2009)
 Last Flight to Abuja
Being Mrs Elliot (2014) 
A Few Good Men
Weekend Getaway
Finding Love
The Duplex (2015)
Remember Me (2016) Acted and produced.
Rumour Has It (2016)
Crazy, Lovely, Cool (2018)
Africa Magics Baby Drama
For Old Times' Sake

See also
 List of Nigerian actors
 List of Nigerian film producers

References

External links

Nigerian film actresses
Living people
Alumni of the University of Greenwich
Nigerian film producers
Igbo actresses
People from Mbaise
Actresses from Imo State
1979 births